The Westpac Outstanding Women Award (shortened to WOW Award) recognizes exceptional professional work of women in Papua New Guinea. Since its inception in 2006, when it was called the Westpac Women in Business Award, the Award has recognized the achievements of individual women in multiple categories. Each category awardee then becomes a finalist for the overall WOW Award. In the face of acknowledged gender inequity in the country, the WOW Awards call attention to the crucial and highly skilled work done by women across a number of sectors. The winner of the WOW Award receives a grant to pursue a formal education, professional mentoring, opportunities for professional learning and networking at an Australian Executive Women's Leadership symposium, and a cash prize. The WOW Awards support the belief that investment in women leads to stronger economic outcomes for a nation as a whole, and strives to provide role models for the girls and women of the country.

Prize categories 
The number of categories in which women are recognized has expanded over the years:

Original categories 

 Public Sector Award
 Entrepreneurship Award
 Private Sector Award
 Community Responsibility Award
 Young Achiever
Westpac Women in Business Award (changed in 2013 to Westpac Outstanding Women Award)

Categories added in 2015 

 Sports Award
 Not for Profit Award

Sponsorship 
Westpac Papua New Guinea, a subsidiary of Westpac Banking Corporation of Australia, is the primary sponsor and organizer of the award.

Other companies have joined in sponsoring one or more awards over the years. Typically, these companies contribute cash to sponsor a prize for the finalist in each category, which supports those finalists in continuing their work.

Selection of recipients 
The WOW Awards extend a call for nominations each year, and filed an average of 70-80 nominations annually. In 2016, there were over 100 nominations. From among these nominations, a judging panel composed of representatives from Westpac, high-level sponsors, and the community picks a first round of finalists. Judges interview each finalist to assess their: capacity to lead, influence, and inspire others in pursuit of challenging goals; record of operating with integrity and good governance; achievement in appropriate areas, such as school, sports, or professional activities; and personal and professional values. Ultimately, the panel selects one finalist per category, and from among these nominees select the overall Westpac Outstanding Woman Awardee.

Award recipients

References 

Papua New Guinean awards
Awards established in 2006
2006 establishments in Papua New Guinea